Stéphane Sarrazin is a Canadian politician who was elected to the Legislative Assembly of Ontario in the 2022 provincial election. He represents the riding of Glengarry—Prescott—Russell as a member of the Progressive Conservative Party of Ontario.

Sarrazin was previously the mayor of Alfred and Plantagenet and the warden of Prescott and Russell United Counties.

References 

Living people
21st-century Canadian politicians
Progressive Conservative Party of Ontario MPPs
Mayors of places in Ontario
People from the United Counties of Prescott and Russell
Year of birth missing (living people)